Pablo Cuevas was the defending champion and successfully defended his title, defeating Pablo Carreño Busta in the final, 7–6(7–4), 6–3.

Seeds
The top four seeds receive a bye into the second round.

Draw

Finals

Top half

Bottom half

Qualifying

Seeds

Qualifiers

Lucky losers
  Roberto Carballés Baena

Qualifying draw

First qualifier

Second qualifier

Third qualifier

Fourth qualifier

References
 Main Draw
 Qualifying Draw

Singles